
Kamienna Góra County is a unit of territorial administration and local government (powiat) in Lower Silesian Voivodeship, south-western Poland. It came into being on January 1, 1999, as a result of the Polish local government reforms passed in 1998. Its administrative seat is the town of Kamienna Góra; the only other town in the county is Lubawka.

As of 2019 the total population of the county is 43,429, out of which the population of Kamienna Góra is 19,010, the population of Lubawka is 6,028 and the rural population is 18,391.

Neighbouring counties
Kamienna Góra County is bordered by Jelenia Góra County to the west, Jawor County to the north and Wałbrzych County to the east. It also borders the Czech Republic to the south.

Administrative division
The county is subdivided into four gminas (one urban, one urban-rural and two rural). These are listed in the following table, in descending order of population.

References

 
Land counties of Lower Silesian Voivodeship